Luc-sur-Mer was a railway station in Luc-sur-Mer on the Caen à la mer railway and opened on 30 June 1875. In July 1876, the line was extended from Luc to Courseulles-sur-Mer

The line from Luc to Courseulles was double in 1900 with the addition of a third  rail for trains of the Chemins de fer du Calvados. The station closed in 1952.

The station was situated near to Avenue Carnot (current name) where the narrow gauge line split, and went towards Ouistreham.

References

Defunct railway stations in Calvados
Railway stations in France opened in 1875
Railway stations closed in 1952